Alexei Rostislavovich Kim (born 21 September 1958) is a Russian Ground Forces colonel general. He is Deputy Chief of the General Staff of the Armed Forces of the Russian Federation.

On 11 January 2023, Kim was appointed deputy commander of all Russian forces in Ukraine, along with Sergey Surovikin and Oleg Salyukov, with the head commander becoming Chief of the General Staff Valery Gerasimov.

References 

1958 births
Living people
Russian military personnel
Russian people of Korean descent
Russian colonel generals
Recipients of the Order "For Merit to the Fatherland", 2nd class
Recipients of the Order "For Merit to the Fatherland", 3rd class
Recipients of the Order "For Merit to the Fatherland", 4th class
Recipients of the Order of Courage
Recipients of the Order of Military Merit (Russia)
Recipients of the Order "For Service to the Homeland in the Armed Forces of the USSR", 3rd class
Recipients of the Medal of Zhukov
Frunze Military Academy alumni
Military Academy of the General Staff of the Armed Forces of Russia alumni
Soviet military personnel of the Soviet–Afghan War
Russian military personnel of the Syrian civil war
Russian military personnel of the 2022 Russian invasion of Ukraine